Magizh Thirumeni is an Indian film director who has worked Tamil language films. After working as an assistant to directors, Selvaraghavan and Gautham Vasudev Menon, he directed five films, including the action thrillers.
Thadaiyara Thaakka (2012), Meaghamann (2013), Thadam (2019), and Kalaga Thalaivan (2022).

Career

Early career 
As a teenager, Magizh Thirumeni was an avid reader of Tamil and Russian literature, and often wrote poetry and short stories revealing he found the experience "fulfilling". He thus moved on to attempting novels and writing scripts, before being smitten by film-making. In the early 2000s, hoping to make a breakthrough in the film industry as a director, Magizh often visited the offices of directors, including P. Vasu and T. Rajender, hoping to join their teams. Director Kasthuri Raja signed on Magizh to work on his son Selvaraghavan's first film, but delays meant he first worked as an assistant director in the team of their coming-of-age film Thulluvadho Ilamai (2002). Magizh then met his mentor Gautham Vasudev Menon at editor Suresh Urs's office while working on the post-production of another film and offered to work with Menon, being signed up to join him during the production of Kaakha Kaakha (2003). He worked extensively on the film as well as on Vettaiyaadu Vilaiyaadu (2006), before leaving Menon's team ten days into the shoot of Pachaikili Muthucharam (2007).

As a director
Magizh made his directorial debut with the 2010 romantic comedy film, Mundhinam Paartheney, featuring a cast of newcomers. His second film, the action thriller, Thadaiyara Thaakka (2012), featuring Arun Vijay and Mamta Mohandas in the lead roles, released in June 2012. It eventually went on to become a sleeper hit. Despite the positive reviews from critics and making profits, Magizh revealed that the film would have done better with a wider release and more publicity. He stated that the "Adults only" censor certificate meant that the film could not stay in the cinema halls for a long period of time. However, it went on to gain a cult following after it was uploaded on YouTube. Magizh then made another action thriller, Meaghamann (2014), with Arya and Hansika Motwani in the lead roles, which released in December 2014, to positive reviews. His next film, Thadam, was his second collaboration with Arun Vijay. It was released in March 2019, to highly positive reviews from both the critics and audience, alike. It went on to become his first blockbuster, and is considered to be one among Arun Vijay's best films. He collaborated with Udhayanidhi Stalin, Nidhi Agerwal, and Arav for his next film, Kalaga Thalaivan. Upon release, in November 2022, it received mixed reviews from the critics.

Personal life

Filmography

As director

As actor

As dubbing artist

References

External links 

1978 births
21st-century Indian film directors
Living people
Tamil film directors
Tamil-language film directors